Razvilka is a rural locality (a selo) in Tomponsky District of the Sakha Republic, Russia, located  from Tyoply Klyuch, the administrative center of the rural okrug, and  from Khandyga, the administrative center of the district. Its population as of the 2010 Census was 76; down from 323 recorded in the 2002 Census.

References

Notes

Sources
Official website of the Sakha Republic. Registry of the Administrative-Territorial Divisions of the Sakha Republic. Tomponsky District. 

Rural localities in Tomponsky District